Cheek pouches are pockets on both sides of the head of some mammals between the jaw and the cheek. They can be found on mammals including the platypus, some rodents, and most monkeys, as well as the marsupial koala. The cheek pouches of chipmunks can reach the size of their body when full.

Description and function 
Cheek pouches are located in the thickness of the flange on both sides of the head of some mammals. Monkeys have open cheek pouches within the oral cavity, but they open out in some rodents of America. Hence the name "diplostomes" is associated with them, which means "two mouths." In some rodents, such as hamsters, the cheek pouches are remarkably developed; they form two bags ranging from the mouth to the front of the shoulders. Étienne Geoffroy Saint-Hilaire described that some bats of the genus Nycteris have an amazing form of cheek pouches, as they have a narrow opening, through which the bat can introduce air, closing the nasal canal through a special mechanism and pushing air under the skin, so they expire in the tissue, which unites the very loose skin to the underlying muscles.

Cheek pouches have several roles; they allow the rapid collection of food, but also serve as temporary storage and transport. In monkeys of the subfamily of Cercopithecinae, they allow for more predigested food. Cheek pouches contribute to the protection of animals by allowing them to carry their food in the pouches to shelter, allowing them to transport their food to safer locations, as they are pressing these pouches to the back of the mouth with the back of the leg, or moving the jaw. The females of some species of hamster are known to hide their young in their cheek pouches to carry them away when they fear danger. Other species of hamsters are known to fill their pouches with air, allowing them to float better while they swim.

The cheek pouches can become infected as a result of an injury caused by a sharp object inserted into them or a fight. An abscess can form, which can be confused with protuberance with stored food. If the abscess bursts and the pus contained therein is absorbed by the animal, it can develop sepsis and die of the poisonous toxins. The cheek pouches can also turn outwards.

The cheek pouches of hamsters have been studied in laboratories to understand vascular membranes and healing better. They are also useful for the study of the immune system, notably in the development of abscesses or tumours.

Examples

Chipmunks 
Chipmunks (Tamias) have large cheek pouches that allow them to transport food. These pouches can reach the size of their body when they are full.

Below is the introduction of the legume (pod) of peanut in the cheek pouch of a chipmunk:

Hamsters 

One of the classic behavioral characteristics of hamsters (subfamily Cricetinae) is food hoarding. Hamsters carry food to their underground storage chambers using their spacious cheek pouches. A hamster "can literally fill its face with food."  When full, the pouches can make the hamsters' heads double, or even triple in size.

Platypus 
The platypus feeds on annelid worms, insect larvae, freshwater shrimps, and yabbies (freshwater crayfish) that it digs out of the riverbed with its snout or catches while swimming. It uses its cheek pouches to carry prey to the surface for eating.

Misconception with Rattus rattus 
The cheek pouch is a specific morphological feature that is evident in particular subgroups of rodents (e.g. Heteromyidae and Geomyidae, or gopher), yet a common misconception is that certain families, such as Muridae (including the common black and brown rats), contain this structure when in fact their cheeks are merely elastic due to a high degree of musculature and innervation in the region. The true cheek pouch, however, is evident in the former Heteromyidae and Geomyidae groups.

Cheek pouches are more pronounced in certain rodents, such as hamsters, yet this structure is also distinguishable on certain species of rat, like the Gambian pouched rat, of which extensive morphological investigations have been conducted. Aspects including rat pouch musculature, vascularization, and innervation were all explored and compiled through this and other studies. The widely distributed Rattus rattus is an example of the rodent family Muridae that lacks a true cheek pouch; rather, they exhibit more elastic cheeks (not true pouches) due to the organization of their cheek musculature.

Concerning the musculature, the cheek pouch is composed primarily of a developed masseter (cheek) muscle that exhibits a high tensile ability. The masseter muscle has been shown to insert into the pectoralis muscles, allowing for a higher degree of food retention. The pouch is clearly divided between a buccal (cheek) and sublingual (below the tongue) portion. Volumetric analyses within this study attributed the differences in net cheek volume between male and female rats to the average size of the respective sexes.

Due to muscle's high nutritional demand, this muscle exhibits vascularization that has been highly studied. Dissections at Boston University by Frank Brodie describe the various bifurcations (or splittings) of the common carotid. This artery splits into an internal and external branch, of which the latter extends dorsally and divides into five branches that supply the general cheek region. The branch that extends dorsally to the ear is known as the auricular branch.

As for innervation of this structure, the associated nerve branches were all found to originate from the facial (CN VII of XII) nerve that initiates at the medulla and passes into the facial canal via the stylomastoid foramen. The primary aforementioned muscle, the masseter, is supplied by two large neural branches known as the temporalis and zygomatic nerves. The buccal divisions of this nerve supply much of the masseter muscle, which ultimately facilitates the voluntary retention of food within the cheek pouch.

References 

Rodent anatomy